Wintringham, based in Victoria, Australia, is a secular, not-for-profit welfare company providing advocacy, support and aged care services to elderly homeless men and women, and to financially disadvantaged elderly people who are at risk of homelessness.

History
Wintringham was established in 1989 by Bryan Lipmann. He had been working as a jackaroo in the bush and, on returning to Melbourne, undertook a Social Work degree. He got a job working at Gordon House, one of Melbourne’s night shelters, where up to 300 homeless men and women lived, some of them for years, under scarifying conditions.

It became Wintringham’s mantra that clients are “aged and homeless” and not “homeless and aged” and therefore should be part of Australia’s mainstream federal aged care funding program and not the homeless services system.

In 2013, Elaine Farrelly, a Melbourne-based freelance writer, published a book about the history of Wintringham called "The Wintringham Story".

In November 2015, the Lord Mayor of Melbourne awarded Bryan Lipmann "Melburnian of the Year'  in acknowledgement of his significant contribution to the life of the city.

Why 'Wintringham'?
There is a famous press photograph of Tiny Wintringham, a portly homeless gentleman with his arms outstretched standing in the doorway of the original Gordon House, a night-shelter where he lived during the 1960s.

In 1970, the owners of Gordon House had decided to have the building pulled down. Knowing that he, and other long-term residents, would thereby be made homeless, Tiny approached politicians, the unionist Norm Gallagher (leader of the Builders Labourers Federation) and newspapers. He made sufficient fuss that the State Government decided to build another Gordon House for Tiny and his comrades. Tiny was quoted in The Age newspaper as saying, “Gordon House is a club—it’s essential for many blokes who have otherwise got no hope. But they don’t want assistance from charitable or religious organisations. They want freedom and independence—to be their own men as far as possible.”

Tiny’s success inspired Bryan Lipmann to name the company after him and has led Wintringham to begin a tradition of naming services after homeless people.

Wintringham Services
Wintringham provides support and services to over 2000 elderly men and women each day, the majority of whom are homeless or at risk of becoming homeless. Wintringham has six registered aged care facilities manages over 600 federally funded aged care packages, has an outreach and advocacy team, and through its subsidiary Wintringham Housing Ltd, owns or manages approximately 500 older persons’ independent housing units.

Wintringham has partnered with Allen Kong Architect in constructing McLean Lodge, Port Melbourne Hostel, Atkins Terrace Housing, Ron Conn Nursing Home, the Eunice Seddon Home and in the re-development of the Alexander Miller Trust portfolio of housing in regional Victoria.

International Awards
In 1998, Port Melbourne Hostel was the first Australian building to win the prestigious World Habitat Award.

In 2011, Wintringham was awarded the United Nations Habitat Scroll of Honour. In the citation, UN Habitat stated that “This is the first time UN-HABITAT recognises an initiative devoted to the elderly, and the first time an Australian project has been awarded.”

References 

Homelessness organizations
Non-profit organisations based in Victoria (Australia)
Homelessness in Australia